Hawksbeak Peak is a mountain summit with an elevation of  located on the crest of the Sierra Nevada mountain range, in northern California, United States. The granitic summit is situated on the common boundary shared by Yosemite National Park with Hoover Wilderness, as well as the common border of Mono County and Tuolumne County. This remote peak is set at the head of Thompson Canyon, approximately eight miles west of Twin Lakes and 17 miles southwest of Bridgeport, the nearest town. The  West Face was first climbed in September 1989 by Alan Swanson and John Nye. This landform's toponym has been officially adopted by the U.S. Board on Geographic Names.

Climate
According to the Köppen climate classification system, Hawksbeak Peak is located in an alpine climate zone. Most weather fronts originate in the Pacific Ocean and travel east toward the Sierra Nevada mountains. As fronts approach, they are forced upward by the peaks (orographic lift), causing moisture in the form of rain or snowfall to drop onto the range. Precipitation runoff from this landform drains northwest into headwaters of the West Walker River, and south to Rancheria Creek via Thompson Canyon.

See also
 
 Geology of the Yosemite area
 Tuolumne Intrusive Suite

References

External links
 Weather forecast: Hawksbeak Peak
 Hawksbeak Peak's West Face (photo): Flickr
 North Face above Kirkwood Lake: Flickr photo

Mountains of Mono County, California
Mountains of Tuolumne County, California
North American 3000 m summits
Mountains of Northern California
Sierra Nevada (United States)
Humboldt–Toiyabe National Forest
Mountains of Yosemite National Park
Mountains of the Sierra Nevada (United States)